Ivan Papanin is a Russian icebreaking patrol ship. She is the first vessel built to the Project 23550 design.  She was launched in October 2019.

The vessels resemble Norway's Svalbard class, but are more heavily armed.

References 

Icebreakers of Russia